is a 2002 video game from Konami, released for GameCube and Xbox in December 2002, for Microsoft Windows in March 2003 in North America, and for PlayStation 2 in June 2003. It is a sequel in the Frogger series of games.

Plot 

The time has come for Frogger to go through his "rite of passage." He has reached an age where every frog must make the transition from boy-frog to teenage-frog.

In order to make that transition, Frogger will journey to the Chamber of the Elders on his most significant birthday and stand before the eight venerable members of the Elder Council. Upon meeting the council, Frogger will be asked to enter a magic portal that will warp him into each one of the elder's worlds. These worlds will serve as a personal test for Frogger to prove that he is a teenager.

In terms of the Frogger timeline, this title takes place right after Frogger's Adventures: Temple of the Frog.

Reception 

Metacritic gave the GameCube port a metascore of 60.

References

2002 video games
GameCube games
PlayStation 2 games
Xbox games
Windows games
Frogger
Video games developed in the United States
RenderWare games
Single-player video games